The 2013 Central Michigan Chippewas football team represented Central Michigan University in the 2013 NCAA Division I FBS football season. They were led by fourth-year head coach Dan Enos and played their home games at Kelly/Shorts Stadium. They were a member of the West Division of the Mid-American Conference. They finished the season 6–6, 5–3 in MAC play to finish in a tie for third place in the West Division. Despite being bowl eligible, they were not invited to a bowl game.

Schedule

Game summaries

Michigan

Sources:

New Hampshire

Sources:

UNLV

Sources:

Toledo

Sources:

NC State

Sources:

Miami (OH)

Sources:

Ohio

Sources:

Northern Illinois

Sources:

Ball State

Sources:

Western Michigan

Sources:

UMass

Sources:

Eastern Michigan

Sources:

References

External links

Central Michigan
Central Michigan Chippewas football seasons
Central Michigan Chippewas football